The Seven Year Itch is a 1952 three-act play written by George Axelrod. The original Broadway production starred Tom Ewell and Vanessa Brown.

The titular phrase, which refers to declining interest in a monogamous relationship after seven years of marriage, has been used by psychologists.

The play was filmed in 1955 as The Seven Year Itch, directed and co-written by Billy Wilder and starring Marilyn Monroe and Ewell, reprising his Broadway role.

Productions
The stage version premiered at the Fulton Theatre on November 20, 1952, and closed there on August 13, 1955, after a run of 1,141 performances, making it the longest-running non-musical play of the 1950s.

Opening night cast 
Tom Ewell as Richard Sherman
Vanessa Brown as The Girl
Neva Patterson as Helen Sherman
Marilyn Clark as Miss Morris
Joan Donovan as Elaine
Robert Emhardt as Dr. Brubaker
Pat Fowler as The Voice of The Girl's Conscience
George Ives as The Voice of Richard's Conscience
George Keane as Tom Mackenzie
Johnny Klein as Ricky Sherman
Irene Moore as Marie What-Ever-Her-Name-Was

Replacement cast members during the original Broadway run included Eddie Albert, Eddie Bracken, and Elliott Nugent as Richard Sherman; Sally Forrest and Louise King as The Girl; and Paulette Girard as Marie What-Ever-Her-Name-Was.

The touring production starred Eddie Bracken as Richard Sherman and also featured Gena Rowlands as Elaine. In London, the West End production starred Rosemary Harris.

Although The Seven Year Itch has never returned to Broadway, it was revived in a 2000 London production starring Daryl Hannah, and the play continues to be produced in community theatres and small professional theatres such as the Ivoryton Playhouse, the American Century Theatre, and the Miami Theatre Center.

Plot
An American husband, married for seven years, fantasises about his adventurous past, and future, particularly with "the girl" who moves into his apartment block.

References

External links

 
 Review of the play as produced by The American Century Theater.
 "George Axelrod and The Great American Sex Farce" at The Cad

Plays by George Axelrod
1952 plays
Broadway plays
American plays adapted into films
Plays set in New York City